Purple Heart Diary is a 1951 American drama film directed by Richard Quine, produced by Sam Katzman and released by Columbia Pictures. It stars Frances Langford and Judd Holdren.

Plot
During World War II, a singing trio goes out on tour entertaining wounded soldiers. They get involved with a severely wounded soldier who is in love with a nurse.

Cast
Frances Langford as Herself
Judd Holdren as Lt. Mike McCormick
Ben Lessy as Himself
Tony Romano as Himself
Aline Towne as Lt. Cathy Dietrich

References

External links

1951 films
Films directed by Richard Quine
1951 drama films
Columbia Pictures films
Purple Heart
Pacific War films
American drama films
American black-and-white films
1950s English-language films
1950s American films